Lisa Raymond and Rennae Stubbs were the defending champions, but competed this year with different partners.

Stubbs teamed up with Meghann Shaughnessy and lost in semifinals to Lindsay Davenport and Lisa Raymond.

Raymond teamed up with Lindsay Davenport and lost in the final to champions Kim Clijsters and Ai Sugiyama. The score was 6–1, 6–4.

Seeds

Draw

Draw

References
 Official results archive (ITF)
 Official results archive (WTA)

State Farm Women's Tennis Classic
2003 WTA Tour